

About NIMCET 
National Institutes of Technology (NITs) are Institutes of National Importance and are Centrally Funded Technical Institutes. The NIT MCA Common Entrance Test(NIMCET), is a National Level Test conducted by NITs for admission to their Master of Computer Applications (MCA) programme. The admission to the MCA programme to the nine NITs at Agartala, Allahabad, Bhopal, Jamshedpur,Kurukshetra, Raipur, Surathkal, Tiruchirappalli (Trichy), and Warangal for the year 2023-24 is based on the Rank obtained in NIMCET-2023 only. The Curriculum and Syllabi of Master of Computer Applications (MCA) programme offered by NITs are designed considering the needs of different Information Technology firms in India and abroad. MCA graduates have high potential for jobs in the IT Sector.

Test Pattern 
NIMCET-2023 test will be conducted with single paper containing 120 multiple choice questions covering the following subjects. Multiple Choice Questions will be written in English Language only and will not be translated into any other language. The distribution of questions and marks is as follows:

Total Marks: 1000

Yearwise Organizing Institutes 

NIT Durgapur discontinued MCA course from 2019.
NIT Calicut step Back from MCA course in 2022.
NIT Patna stepped back in 2022.

* NIT Warangal offers a three-year duration MCA program but with an option for the students to exit at the end of successful two years and the title of such exit would be Post -Graduate Advanced Diploma in Computer Applications.

References

National Institutes of Technology
Engineering entrance examinations in India
2007 establishments in India